Nallıhan is a rural town and district of Ankara Province in the Central Anatolia region of Turkey, 157km from the city of Ankara. According to the 2010 census, population of the district is 30,571 of which 12,457 live in the town of Nallıhan. The district covers an area of 1,978km², and the average elevation is 625 m.

Nallıhan is one of many towns that claim to be the burial place of Taptuk Emre, who lived in the 12-13 century, and was the teacher of the folk poet and dervish Yunus Emre. Nallıhan Davutoğlan Bird Paradise attracts local and foreign tourists.

Name
Nallıhan is named after a caravanserai on the ancient Silk Road to the Orient next to the river Nallı. There has been a settlement here for thousands of years.

Today
Today the town is known for its needlework and local cuisine including stuffed vine-leaves, pilav, pumpkin dessert, gozleme (flat bread with cheese and potatoes filling), and many other types of more fine pastries such as baklava with locally grown walnut. The countryside is used for growing rice, wheat, barley, grapes, apples, tomatoes, and lavender. 
Almost everything grows in the fertile soils of Nalliah such as figs, olives, mulberry, pears, apple, persimmons, quince, hazelnut, pecans, squashes, beans, and melons. 

Visitors can walk through the idyllic Ottoman villages (e.g., Akdere) and have local cuisine in the ottoman era Caravan Palace.

Administrative structure

Towns
 Çayırhan
 Sarıyar

Villages

 Akdere
 Aksu
 Alanköy
 Aliefe
 Alpağut
 Arkutça
 Atça
 Aydoğmuş
 Aşağıbağdere
 Aşağıbağlıca
 Aşağıkavacık
 Belenalan
 Belenören
 Beyalan
 Beycik
 Beydili
 Bozyaka
 Cendere
 Çalıcaalan
 Çamalan
 Çiller
 Çive
 Çulhalar
 Danişment
 Davutoğlan
 Demirköy
 Dereköy
 Doğandere
 Döğmeci
 Emremsultan
 Epçeler
 Ericek
 Eymir
 Eğriköy
 Gökçeöz
 Güzelöz
 Hacıhasanlar
 Hıdırlar
 İslamalanı
 Kabaca
 Kadıköy
 Karacasu
 Karahisar
 Karahisargölcük
 Karahisarkozlu
 Karaköy
 Kavakköy
 Kulu
 Kuruca
 Kuzucular
 Meyildere
 Meyilhacılar
 Nallıdere
 Nallıgölcük
 Nebioğlu
 Osmanköy
 Ozanköy
 Ömerşeyhler
 Öşürler
 Sarıkaya
 Soğukkuyu
 Subaşı
 Tekirler
 Tekkeköy
 Tepeköy
 Uluhan
 Uluköy
 Uzunöz
 Yakapınar
 Yenice
 Yeşilyurt
 Yukarıbağdere
 Yukarıbağlıca
 Yukarıkavacık

Places of interest
Nallıhan Kuş Cenneti - Sarıyar reservoir is teeming with bird-life. It is a natural habitat for several endangered bird species in Turkey. 
Kocahan - Ottoman vizier Nasuh Pasha stopped by this place in 1599 and made it built. It is in a rectangular shape and has cafes and shops in its 46 rooms.
Ilıca/Uyuzsuyu waterfall - The waterfall that reside in the road to Göynük, is the only waterfall in the borders of Turkey's capital, Ankara. It got its name "Uyuzsuyu" because there is a belief that its water cures skin diseases.

See also
Sarıyar Dam

Notes

References

External links

Nallıhan website 
District governor's official website 
District municipality's official website 
A local information website 

 
Populated places in Ankara Province
Districts of Ankara Province